The Elks Lodge, or Medford Elks Building (also known as BPOE Lodge No. 1168), in Medford, Oregon, was built in 1915. The building, located at 202 N. Central Ave, was closed by the Benevolent and Protective Order of Elks in 2014, and sold in 2017. It was named one of Oregon's Most Endangered Places by Restore Oregon.

The building was designed by architect Frank Chamberlain Clark in Beaux Arts style.

See also
 List of Elks buildings
 List of Oregon's Most Endangered Places

References

External links
 

1915 establishments in Oregon
Beaux-Arts architecture in Oregon
Buildings and structures completed in 1915
Buildings and structures in Medford, Oregon
Elks buildings
National Register of Historic Places in Jackson County, Oregon
Oregon's Most Endangered Places